José Guadalupe Posada Aguilar (2 February 1852 – 20 January 1913) was a Mexican political lithographer who used relief printing to produce popular illustrations. His work has influenced numerous Latin American artists and cartoonists because of its satirical acuteness and social engagement. He used skulls, calaveras, and bones to convey political and cultural critiques.
Among his most enduring works is La Calavera Catrina.

Early life and education 

Posada was born in Aguascalientes on 2 February 1852. His father was Germán Posada Serna and his mother Petra Aguilar Portillo. Posada was one of eight children and received his early education from his older brother Cirilo, a country school teacher. Posada's brother taught him reading, writing and drawing. He then joined La Academia Municipal de Dibujo de Aguascalientes (the Municipal Drawing Academy of Aguascalientes). Later, in 1868, as a teenager he apprenticed in the workshop of Jose Trinidad Pedroza, who taught him lithography and engraving.

In 1871, before he was out of his teens, his career began with a job as the political cartoonist for a local newspaper in Aguascalientes, El Jicote ("The Bumblebee"), where his first cartoons were published. The newspaper closed after 11 issues, reportedly because one of Posada's cartoons had offended a powerful local politician. In 1872, Posada and Pedroza dedicated themselves to commercial lithography in León, Guanajuato. While in Leon, Posada opened his own workshop and worked as a teacher of lithography at the local secondary school. He also continued his work with lithographs and wood engravings. In 1873, he returned to his home in Aguascalientes City where he married María de Jesús Vela in 1875. The following year he purchased the printing press from Pedroza.

From 1875 to 1888, Posada continued to collaborate with several newspapers in León, including La Gacetilla, el Pueblo Caótico and La education. He survived the great flood of León on 18 June 1888, of which he published several lithographs representing the tragedy in which more than two hundred and fifty corpses were found and more than 1,400 people were reported missing.

At the end of 1888, he moved to Mexico City, where he learned the craft and technique of engraving in lead and zinc. He collaborated with the newspaper La Patria Ilustrada and the Revisita de Mexico until the early months of 1890.

Career as artist 

He began to work with Antonio Vanegas Arroyo, until he was able to establish his own lithographic workshop. From then on Posada undertook work that earned him popular acceptance and admiration for his sense of humor and propensity concerning the quality of his work. In his broad and varied work, Posada portrayed beliefs, daily lifestyles of popular groups, the abuses of government, and the exploitation of the common people. He illustrated the famous skulls, along with other illustrations that became popular as they were distributed to various newspapers and periodicals.

In 1883, following his success, he was hired as a teacher of lithography at the local Preparatory School. The shop flourished until 1888 when a disastrous flood hit the city. He subsequently moved to Mexico City. His first regular employment in the capital was with La Patria Ilustrada, whose editor was Ireneo Paz, the grandfather of the later famed writer Octavio Paz. He later joined the staff of a publishing firm owned by Antonio Vanegas Arroyo and while at this firm he created a prolific number of book covers and illustrations. Much of his work was also published in sensationalistic broadsides depicting various current events.

From the outbreak of the Mexican Revolution in 1910 until his death in 1913, Posada worked tirelessly in the press. The works he completed in his press during this time allowed him to develop his artistic prowess as a draftsman, engraver and lithographer. At the time he continued to make satirical illustrations and cartoons featured in the magazine, El Jicote. He played a crucial role for the government during the presidency of Francisco I Madero and during the campaign of Emiliano Zapata.

Notable works 
Posada's best known works are his calaveras. His most famous and influential work is the La Calavera Catrina, which was first published posthumously in a 1913 broadside. Catrina was probably intended as a satirical portrait of Mexican elites who were imitating European fashions, but the text, which was not written by the artist, satirized working class vendors of chickpeas. Posada's Catrina image appeared in several other broadsides. It was elaborated into full figure by the muralist Diego Rivera. Catrina is now the most widespread image associated with Day of the Dead.

Later life and death 
Largely forgotten by the end of his life, José Guadalupe Posada died in 1913 of gastroenteritis. Three of his neighbors certified his death, although only one of them knew his full name. He reportedly died penniless and was buried in an unmarked pauper's grave.

Legacy 

Academics have estimated that during his long career, Posada produced 20,000 plus images for broadsheets, pamphlets and chapbooks. Posada was studied by key figures of Mexican muralism, including Jean Charlot, Diego Rivera, and José Clemente Orozco, who created a national art.

In the 1920s, the French born Mexican artist Jean Charlot was the first to popularize Posada's broadsides as art. In 1929 Anita Brenner's book Idols Behind Altars used Posada's illustrations. Brenner called Posada a prophet and linked him to the Mexica, peasants and workers. The US author Frances Toor promoted Posada as folklore with her 1930 book Posada: Grabador Mexicano, the first monograph on Posada. Rivera commented on 406 engravings by Posada in the foreword for the book.

When Leopoldo Méndez returned from the Cultural Missions programs of the Mexican Secretariat of Public Education in Jalisco, Méndez got to know about Posada's prints and adopted him as artistic and cultural hero. One of Méndez's last projects was a study of Posada, where Méndez reproduced over 900 Posada illustrations.

See also 
 Nota roja

References

External links 
 José Guadalupe Posada prints, 1880–1943, Getty Research Institute, Research Library, Accession no. 960060.
 Posada Art Foundation

1852 births
1913 deaths
19th-century engravers
20th-century engravers
Mexican engravers
Mexican caricaturists
Mexican illustrators
Mexican printmakers
People from Aguascalientes City
19th-century Mexican male artists
20th-century Mexican male artists
Artists from Aguascalientes